Germano Longo (24 May 1933 – 14 July 2022) was an Italian actor and voice actor. He was sometimes credited as Herman Lang or Grant Laramy.

Life and career 
Born in Poggiardo, Longo attended the Centro Sperimentale di Cinematografia in Rome, graduating in 1953. He was very active in genre films, particularly peplum, adventure and Spaghetti Western films. He was also active as a dubber and as a dubbing director.

Selected filmography 
 The Dragon's Blood (1957)
 Slave Women of Corinth (1958) 
 The Corsican Brothers (1961) 
 Queen of the Seas (1961)
 Guns of the Black Witch (1961)
 Pirate of the Black Hawk (1961)
 Sword in the Shadows (1961)
 The Secret of the Black Falcon (1961)
 Colossus of the Arena (1962) 
 I am Semiramis (1963) 
 The Revenge of Spartacus (1965) 
 I criminali della metropoli (1965) 
 Adiós gringo (1965) 
 The Murder Clinic (1966) 
 Twenty Thousand Dollars for Seven (1969) 
 The Howl (1970)
 Sunflower (1970)
 Claretta and Ben (1974)
 Amore amaro (1974)
 A Sold Life (1976)

References

External links 
 
 

1933 births
2022 deaths
20th-century Italian male actors
Italian male film actors
Italian male voice actors
Italian voice directors
Male actors from Rome
Centro Sperimentale di Cinematografia alumni
Male Spaghetti Western actors